Music for Robots is a collaborative project composed by Squarepusher and performed by the three robots that comprise the Z-Machines, released on 7 April (8 April in North America) 2014.

Having been approached by the team of Japanese roboticists behind the three Z-Machine robots to compose music for the project in 2013, Squarepusher composed the piece "Sad Robot Goes Funny" which was used in a film of the robots performing directed by Daito Manabe - available to watch on YouTube.

Following the success of the initial piece of music, Squarepusher went on to compose and record the additional four pieces that make up the Music for Robots EP.

Track listing

Charts

References

Warp (record label) EPs
Squarepusher EPs
2014 EPs